Desmond Spackman (born 4 January 1929) is an Australian field hockey player. He competed at the 1956 Summer Olympics and the 1960 Summer Olympics.

References

External links
 

1929 births
Living people
Australian male field hockey players
Olympic field hockey players of Australia
Field hockey players at the 1956 Summer Olympics
Field hockey players at the 1960 Summer Olympics